Nykyfor Timofiyovych Kalchenko (– 14 May 1989) was a Ukrainian and Soviet politician, who served as the chairman of the Council of Ministers of the Ukrainian SSR (equivalent of today's prime-minister).

Biography
Nykyfor Kalchenko was born in a peasant family in a small village in Poltava Oblast, central Ukraine.

Awards
Nykyfor Kalchenko was awarded the Hero of Socialist Labour in 1976.

References

1906 births
1989 deaths
People from Poltava Oblast
People from Poltava Governorate
Ukrainian people in the Russian Empire
Heroes of Socialist Labour
Chairpersons of the Council of Ministers of Ukraine
First deputy chairpersons of the Council of Ministers of Ukraine
First convocation members of the Verkhovna Rada of the Ukrainian Soviet Socialist Republic
Politburo of the Central Committee of the Communist Party of Ukraine (Soviet Union) members
20th-century Ukrainian politicians
Second convocation members of the Verkhovna Rada of the Ukrainian Soviet Socialist Republic
Third convocation members of the Verkhovna Rada of the Ukrainian Soviet Socialist Republic
Fourth convocation members of the Verkhovna Rada of the Ukrainian Soviet Socialist Republic
Fifth convocation members of the Verkhovna Rada of the Ukrainian Soviet Socialist Republic
Sixth convocation members of the Verkhovna Rada of the Ukrainian Soviet Socialist Republic
Seventh convocation members of the Verkhovna Rada of the Ukrainian Soviet Socialist Republic
Eighth convocation members of the Verkhovna Rada of the Ukrainian Soviet Socialist Republic
Ninth convocation members of the Verkhovna Rada of the Ukrainian Soviet Socialist Republic
Rural economy ministers of Ukraine